The men's long jump event at the 1966 European Indoor Games was held on 27 March in Dortmund.

Medalists

Results

Qualification

Final

References

Long jump at the European Athletics Indoor Championships
Long